Albert Grajales was the  director of the Puerto Rico INTERPOL office. and Coordinator of Intelligence and Antiterrorism (CIA).

Early years
Grajales was born in Brooklyn, New York, in December 9 of 1962, and at the age of six his family and him moved to Aguadilla, Puerto Rico.
Albert was a Sergeant Major at the US Jr. Army of the American Crusaders Cadets. In high school he was for three years the president of Distributive Education Clubs of America – DECA (organization) where he won the national DECA male leader of Puerto Rico.  He was an advocate for the Muscular Dystrophy Association (MDA) and the youth republican party of Puerto Rico.

Law enforcement and Intelligence career

As the Special Assistant to the attorney general of Puerto Rico Guillermo Somoza Colombani, Albert Grajales was the INTERPOL director in the Commonwealth government of Puerto Rico. He was also the Coordinator of Intelligence and Anti-terrorism (CIA) representing the Justice Department and the Governor office. He was in charge of all investigative operations of intelligence and counter intelligence concerning the criminal act on terrorism in Puerto Rico. He worked in conjunction with the FBI National Security Branch in terrorism investigative matters.

Albert Grajales was the representative for the Attorney General and the Negociado de Investigaciones Especiales (NIE) (Special Investigations Bureau) for:

 Executive Board Member of HIDTA (High Intensive Drug Trafficking Area) in PR and USVI
 HIDTA Intelligence Subcommittee Executive member for PR and USVI
 Executive Board Member of PR State Homeland Security Fusion Center)
 Member of FBI's JTTF (Joint Terrorism Task Force) of the FBI
 INTERPOL point of contact for Puerto Rico for the Amazon counterterrorism program (Fusion  Task Force on Terrorism)
 The Governor of Puerto Rico representative for the Memorial Institute for Prevention of Terrorism MIPT
 Puerto Rico government liaison for the Central Intelligence Agency (CIA)

Career highlight: special representation and assignments

 Mr. Grajales was the special representative for Hon. Luis G. Fortuño, Governor of Commonwealth of Puerto Rico on Intelligence and Counter   Terrorism matters for the US States Intelligence Community Agencies.
 Agent attached to The United States Secret Service branch office of PR for three years. Based on Linked In.
 INTERPOL Chairman of the Fusion Terrorism Task Force summit meeting on Counter Terrorism the Amazon Project, Sponsored by the General Secretary of INTERPOL held 2009 in Puerto Rico
  Coordinator of Intelligence / Antiterrorism State official (DOJ/Governor) in charge of the Central American and Caribbean Olympic Games of 2010, Puerto Rico
  Coordinator of Intelligence / Antiterrorism State official (DOJ/Governor) in charge of the visit of US President Hon. Barack Obama, 2011 in P.R.

Intelligence Consulting 
Currently Albert Grajales is the CEO of Equinox Phoenix Intelligence Consulting (EPIC).

Active member of the Association of Former Intelligence Officers (AFIO).

Albert is a volunteer advocate for the Central Intelligence Agency.

A Sifu in the Martial Arts and a Hall of Fame Inductee

Accolades
Al was a speaker at the 2012 Raleigh Spy Conference.

He host and produce his radio program called Contra-Inteligencia at Radio Una 1340AM (WWNA) in Puerto Rico.

Albert is an OP Columnist for El Nuevo Dia de Puerto Rico specialize on intelligence, counterterrorism and other security matters.

See also 
List of Puerto Ricans

References

External links 
Original JKD
http://albertgrajales.wix.com/equinox-phoenix-ic
LinkedIn
https://www.facebook.com/Contra-Inteligencia-768387633182050/ Contra-Inteligencia, Radio Una 1340AM on Facebook

1962 births
Living people
Interpol officials
American Jeet Kune Do practitioners
Historians of espionage
Counterterrorism theorists
Psychological warfare theorists